Tom Holroyd (born 9 February 2001) is a professional rugby league footballer who plays as a  forward for the Leeds Rhinos in the Super League.

He has spent time on loan from Leeds at Featherstone Rovers in the Betfred Championship.

Background
Holroyd was born in Pecket Well Park, Hebden Bridge, West Yorkshire, England.

He studied at Calder High School in West Yorkshire

Career

Leeds Rhinos
In 2018 he made his Super League début for the Rhinos against St Helens.

References

External links
Leeds Rhinos profile
SL profile

2001 births
Living people
English rugby league players
Featherstone Rovers players
Leeds Rhinos players
Rugby league players from Yorkshire